Roger Farrant Bland,  (born 3 April 1955) is a British curator and numismatist. At the British Museum, he served as Keeper of the Department of Portable Antiquities and Treasure from 2005 to 2013, Keeper of the Department of Prehistory and Europe from 2012 to 2013, and Keeper of the Department of Britain, Europe and Prehistory from 2013 to 2015. Since 2015, he has been a visiting professor at the University of Leicester and a Senior Fellow of the McDonald Institute for Archaeological Research, University of Cambridge.

Career
In 1979, Bland joined the British Museum as a curator in the Department of Coins and Medals. From 1994 to 2003, he was seconded to the Department of National Heritage (DNH) and then the Department for Culture, Media and Sport as British Museum advisor. He was deputy keeper of the Department of Coins and Medals from 2001 to 2005, and then keeper (ie head) of the Department of Portable Antiquities and Treasure from 2005 to 2013. He was additionally Keeper of the Department of Prehistory and Europe from 2012 to 2013, before serving as Keeper of the newly created Department of Britain, Europe and Prehistory from 2013 until his retirement from the British Museum in 2015.

On 11 August 2020, it was announced that he would chair the Treasure Valuation Committee for a five year term from August 2020 until August 2025.

Personal life
Bland is an Anglican Christian. He was a churchwarden and treasurer of St Margaret's, Cley from 2015 to 2020, and has been a lay reader in the Diocese of Norwich since 2018.

Honours

On 6 May 1993, Bland was elected a Fellow of the Society of Antiquaries of London (FSA). In the 2008 Queen's Birthday Honours, he was appointed an Officer of the Order of the British Empire (OBE) "for services to Heritage". In 2014, he was awarded the Medal of the Royal Numismatic Society. In 2016, he was awarded the President's Medal by the British Academy "for his contribution to the protection, and academic and public understanding, of Britain’s cultural heritage".

Selected works

References

External links

 Curriculum Vitae

1955 births
Living people
British curators
British numismatists
Employees of the British Museum
Officers of the Order of the British Empire
Fellows of the Society of Antiquaries of London
Presidents of the Royal Numismatic Society
Recipients of the President's Medal (British Academy)
Anglican lay readers
People associated with the Portable Antiquities Scheme